Below is the list of measuring instruments used in electrical and electronic work.

See also
 E-meter

Equipment
 
Electronic test equipment
Measuring instruments